High Speed 2 is a planned, partly under construction, high-speed railway line in the United Kingdom.

High Speed 2 may also refer to:

 The Getaway: High Speed II, a 1992 pinball game

See also
 HSL 2, High Speed Line 2, a railway in Belgium
 HS2 (disambiguation)